Pethwadaj Dam is an earthfill dam on local river near Kandhar, Nanded district in the state of Maharashtra in India.

Specifications

Purpose
 Irrigation

See also
 Dams in Maharashtra
 List of reservoirs and dams in India

References

Dams in Nanded district
Dams completed in 1980
1980 establishments in Maharashtra
20th-century architecture in India